Peter Dal was the name of two ships operated by the Dalhousie Steam and Motorshipping Company.

Ship names